The Victorian HPV Grand Prix Series is an annual championship held in Victoria featuring HPV's (human powered vehicles) racing around enclosed circuits for periods between six and 24 hours.

2020 Event Calendar

Round 1 - Lang Lang

Round 1 of the Victorian HPV Series is a six-hour race at the Lang Lang Rec Reserve.

Round 2 - Winton 

Round 2 of the Victorian HPV Series is one of the best race tracks in Victoria. Held at Winton Motor raceway in Benalla This 24 hour race will be the first time Hpv racing heads to this great racetrack.

Round 3 - Kilsyth

Round 4 - Casey Fields

Round 4 of the Victorian HPV Series returns to the Casey Fields Criterium Circuit for another six hour race. The longer version of the track is used for the final round. This is a compulsory round for teams to be eligible for championship points.

Results

2011 Championship

2012 Championship

2013 Championship

Other Australian HPV races and series

  Queensland - RACQ Technology Challenge
  South Australia - Australian HPV Super Series
  Victoria - RACV Energy Breakthrough

References

Sports competitions in Victoria (Australia)